Shri Lakshmi Narayan Mandir Orlando is a Hindu Temple located in Orlando, Florida. The temple is a member of the Interfaith Council of Central Florida, dedicated to establishing dialogue between different religious groups in Florida.  The temple is located at 251 N Klondike Ave, Orlando, Florida, 32811

History
SLN Mandir Orlando was established in 1992 for the 3,500 Hindu Families in the Orlando Metropolitan Area. In 1998, Local Hindus celebrated Diwali and due to the size of the crowd needed to rent space at Maynard Evans High School. The temple also celebrates Holi.

References

Buildings and structures in Orange County, Florida
Hinduism in the United States
Religious buildings and structures completed in 1991
1992 establishments in Florida
Religious organizations established in 1992
Asian-American culture in Florida
Indian-American culture in Florida